Rejoice is an album by American vocal group the Emotions issued in June 1977 by Columbia Records. The album reached No. 1 on the Billboard Top R&B Albums chart and No. 7 on the Billboard 200 chart. Rejoice has also been certified Platinum in the US by the RIAA.

Overview
The album was produced by EWF leader Maurice White. When asked about his favorite non–Earth, Wind & Fire album, White replied: "The Emotions's 'Rejoice' because it had a great vibe, a great ‘feel’. Yeah, I'm proud of that production."

Rejoice also spent seven weeks atop the Billboard Top R&B Albums chart.

Critical reception

Ace Adams of the New York Daily News stated "This record displays the growing talent of these rising stars. People said "This LP offers no messages, pretensions or sexual innuendos but simple romantic themes by four sisters, Wanda, Sheila, Pamela and Jeanette Hutchinson. Their tight harmonies and polished chords make them logical successors to the original Supremes. Producer Maurice White of Earth, Wind and Fire (with whom the girls have toured) provides lush arrangements and joins lead singer Wanda in a smoothly worked Key to My Heart." Larry Rohter of the Washington Post wrote "As much because of their material as the(ir) vocal style, the Emotions have been able to inject some life and excitement into a soul format that badly needed it."

Phyl Garland of Stereo Review proclaimed "Though there is nothing here that is truly new in terms of musical format or content, "Rejoice" demonstrates what can be done within the limits of popular style
when talent and imagination are applied." Garland described the girl group's performance as "thrice nice" and called Rejoice a "very good" album. With a 4 out of 5 stars rating Craig Lytle of Allmusic found that "The radiance the Emotions impart is heartwarming and uplifting. Their gospel roots bring a welcome spiritual feel to this album, which is a superb effort." Robert Hilburn of the Los Angeles Times commented "Produced by Earth, Wind & Fire's Maurice White, the album has material that is ideal for the female vocal trio's mostly light, upbeat style. The arrangements, too, are skillfully tailored. Not much adventure here, but solid craftsmanship. That ought to count for something these days."

Singles
With the LP came the single  "Don't Ask My Neighbors" which reached No. 7 on the Billboard Hot Soul Singles chart.
The other single released called Best of My Love", reached No. 1 on both the US Billboard Hot 100 and Hot Soul Songs charts. "Best of My Love" won a Grammy for Best R&B Performance By a Duo or Group with Vocals, and an American Music Award for Favorite Soul/R&B Single. Best of My Love has also been certified Platinum in the US by the RIAA.

Track listing

Personnel
The Emotions
Wanda Hutchinson – vocals
Sheila Hutchinson – vocals
Pamela Hutchinson – vocals
Jeanette Hutchinson – vocals

Musicians
Clarence McDonald – piano, clavinet  
Marlo Henderson (tracks 2-3, 6, 9), Al McKay (1, 4-5, 7-8) – guitar 
David Shields (tracks 2-3, 6, 9), Verdine White (1, 4-5, 7-8)  – bass 
James Gadson (tracks 2-3, 6, 9), Fred White (1, 4-5, 7-8) – drums 
Paulinho DaCosta – percussion 
Larry Dunn – synthesizer (tracks 1, 5)
Maurice White – drums (tracks 7-8), additional vocals (4)
Jerry Peters (track 8), Skip Scarborough (7) – electric piano
George Bohanon, Louis Satterfield, Lew McCreary, George Thatcher – trombones 
Oscar Brashear, Steve Madaio, Chuck Findley – trumpets
Alan Robinson, Marilyn Robinson, Vincent DeRosa, Sidney Muldrow, Richard Perissi – French horns 
Don Myrick – saxophones, flute 
Charles Veal, Jr. – concertmaster 
Israel Baker, Arnold Belnick, Janice Gower, Betty LaMagna, Dorothy Wade, Robert Sushel – violins 
Rollice Dale, Denyse Buffum, Paul Polivnick – violas 
Raymond Kelley, Selene Hurford, Dennis Karmazyn – cellos
Dorothy Ashby – harp 
Tom Tom 84 (Thomas Washington) - horn and string arrangements

Charts

Singles

See also
List of number-one R&B albums of 1977 (U.S.)

References

External links
Rejoice at Discogs

1977 albums
Columbia Records albums
The Emotions albums
Albums produced by Maurice White
Albums recorded at Sunset Sound Recorders
Albums recorded at Wally Heider Studios